Jackie Lance (born June 9, 1974) is a Canadian softball right fielder. 

Born  in Grande Prairie, Alberta, Lancee began playing softball at age eight, and is a graduate of the University of New Mexico. She was a part of the Canadian Softball team which finished eighth at the 2000 Summer Olympics and fifth at the 2004 Summer Olympics.

References

1974 births
Sportspeople from Alberta
Living people
University of New Mexico alumni
Olympic softball players of Canada
People from Grande Prairie
Softball players at the 2000 Summer Olympics
Softball players at the 2004 Summer Olympics
Canadian softball players